Singar Nagar is an elevated metro station located on the Red Line of Lucknow Metro in the city of Lucknow Uttar Pradesh.

History

Structure

Station layout

Connections

Entry/Exit

See also

References

External links

 website

 UrbanRail.Net – descriptions of all metro systems in the world, each with a schematic map showing all stations.

Lucknow Metro stations
Railway stations in India opened in 2017